11th Group may refer to:

 Eleventh Army Group (United Kingdom), a formation of the United Kingdom Army
 11th Carrier Air Group, a formation of the Royal Navy

See also
 11th Army (disambiguation)
 XI Corps (disambiguation)
 11th Division (disambiguation)
 11th Brigade (disambiguation)
 11th Regiment (disambiguation)
 11 Squadron (disambiguation)